Julian Stanley Wise (1900 – July 22, 1985), was the founder of the Roanoke Life Saving and First Aid Crew, the first volunteer rescue squad in the United States.

In 1909, Wise was walking along the banks of the Roanoke River in Roanoke, Virginia, when he witnessed two men capsize a canoe in deep, rough water. Though many onlookers saw the accident, none of them had the equipment or training to offer much in the way of help, and both men drowned. Wise later said of the incident, "I vowed that never again would I watch a man die when he could have been saved if only those around him knew how."

That incident stayed with Wise, and on May 28, 1928, Wise and nine coworkers at the Norfolk and Western Railway began the first volunteer rescue squad. Wise proved the worth of the squad by staging a mock rescue in 1929, sinking a 250-pound dummy in a pond and calling out the rescue squad. The city of Roanoke, impressed by the demonstration, agreed to provide communication support. A local funeral home donated an ambulance, and Wise's vision became a reality.

By 1966, when the National Traffic and Motor Vehicle Safety Act was passed in the United States, thousands of rescue squads had sprung up throughout the United States and elsewhere in the world. With the passage of the Highway Safety Act, training standards for Emergency Medical Technicians were enacted.

Julian Wise died in Roanoke on July 22, 1985, at the age of 85.

On June 8, 1991, The Julian Stanley Wise Foundation opened a volunteer rescue museum in Roanoke. Julian Wise's widow, Ruth Light Wise, was present at the opening.

References 
 "EMT Rescue", by Pat Ivey

Disaster preparedness in the United States
1900 births
1985 deaths
People from Roanoke, Virginia
Date of birth missing